Zîrnești is a commune in Cahul District, Moldova. It is composed of three villages: Paicu, Tretești and Zîrnești.

References

Communes of Cahul District